is a Japanese poet and novelist  born on June 16, 1948. He dropped out of Aoyama Gakuin University while he was majoring in economics.

Biography
While in Aoyama, he ran a business known as Nejime Mingeiten, a folk craft store.  He also was a member of a grass lot baseball team known as the "Fouls".
In 1989, he won the Naoki Prize. In 1997, he became the first champion of "Poetry Boxing".
In 2001, he was in charge of the NHK panel "Words of Power, Poems of Power".

Novels
Poetry Anthologies
Negima Shoichi Shishu (Negima Shoichi Poetry Anthology)
Noumaku Menma
Kōenji Junjō Shōtengai (Koenji pure heart shopping street)

Essays
I want to give the power of words
The enigma of a Nagasaki home.
200 Letters to Nagasaki
Nejime's bruxism

Awards
1989 Naoki Prize.
One of his stories appears in Read Real Japanese

References

Living people
1948 births
Aoyama Gakuin University alumni